Smyth v. Ames, 171 U.S. 361 (1898), also called The Maximum Freight Case, was an 1898 United States Supreme Court case. The Supreme Court voided a Nebraska railroad tariff law, declaring that it violated the Fourteenth Amendment to the United States Constitution in that it takes property without the due process of law. The Court defined the constitutional limits of governmental power to set railroad and utility rates by stating that regulated industries have the right to a "fair return". The ruling was later overturned in Federal Power Commission v. Hope Natural Gas Co.

The decision was unanimous and the majority opinion was written by Justice John M. Harlan.

Prior history
On April 12, 1893, Nebraska passed a law, a so-called "maximum rate bill", establishing maximum rates for the transportation of freights within the state. The Railroad Commissioners of Nebraska were empowered to reduce any freight rate.

Several precedents had been set by the Supreme Court regarding state control over railways. Until Munn v. Illinois when the Granger Laws were declared constitutional, it had been held that railway property was protected from state authority by the Contract Clause of the Constitution, which states that no state shall pass any "Law impairing the Obligation of Contracts". However, in the Munn case, the Court ruled that all property was held subject to legislative regulation if it was "affected with a public interest". Further decisions built off the Munn decision, specifying that while the legislature may regulate property "affected by the public interest", they must exercise it reasonably by applying the used and useful principle, so as to not deprive citizens of their property without due process of law.

Case
The maximum rate law was contested by the Union Pacific, St. Joseph and Grand Island Railway, Omaha and Republican Valley Railway, and the Kansas City and Omaha Railway. They claimed the law was confiscation, and therefore unconstitutional. They said the law would make a difference of $2,250,00 annually.

The Supreme Court unanimously found the law unconstitutional. The court found that it is not enough to show a tariff – even if the tax is in the public interest – still leaves a company enough money to pay operating expenses and stock dividends.

Effects of the decision
Businessmen were pleased by the decision, and believed it would give stability to railroad investments. Others were unhappy.

The Interstate Commerce Commission was weakened by the Court's decision.

Subsequent history
The ruling was overturned in the 1944 case of Federal Power Commission v. Hope Natural Gas Co. The named plaintiff in the case, Nebraska Attorney General Constantine Joseph Smyth, later served as Chief Justice of the Court of Appeals of the District of Columbia.

References

External links
 

United States Constitution Article One case law
United States Supreme Court cases
United States Supreme Court cases of the Fuller Court
1898 in United States case law
Legal history of Nebraska
Contract Clause case law
Rail transportation in Nebraska